The 4th Vuelta a España (Tour of Spain), a long-distance bicycle stage race and one of the three grand tours, was held from 30 June to 19 July 1942. Berrendero also won the mountains classification.

Teams and riders

Route

Results

Final General Classification

References

 
1942
1942 in Spanish sport
1942 in road cycling